Fidel Wagner (17 March 1912 – 14 February 1945) was a German skier. He competed in the Nordic combined event at the 1936 Winter Olympics. He was killed in action during World War II.

References

External links
 

1912 births
1945 deaths
German male Nordic combined skiers
Olympic Nordic combined skiers of Germany
Nordic combined skiers at the 1936 Winter Olympics
People from Oberallgäu
Sportspeople from Swabia (Bavaria)
German military personnel killed in World War II
Missing in action of World War II